Luis Fonseca may refer to:

Luis Fonseca (runner) (born 1977), Venezuelan marathon runner
Luis Fonseca (United States Navy) (born 1980), hospital corpsman and Navy Cross recipient
Luis Fonseca (weightlifter) (born 1949), Costa Rican Olympic weightlifter

See also
Fonseca (surname)